Clonostachys may refer to:
Clonostachys Klotzsch, 1841, a genus of plants in synonymy with Sebastiania
Clonostachys Corda, 1839, a genus of fungi including Clonostachys rosea f. rosea